Dilemme is a French TV reality show broadcasting on W9 in France. It is a reality TV show which is live. 
15 Contestants, 7 men and 8 women get chosen and split into 2 equal teams. The two teams then compete and over time each member gets eliminated. Finally once there are 2 candidates left the winner wins a cash prize.

This game was invented by producer Alexia Laroche-Joubert, was led by Faustine Bollaert and David Lantin (who was locked up with competitors). Finally won the game fu July 15, 2010 by Jean-Charles Mougenot with 40% of public votes.

Nominations Table 

French reality television series
2010 French television series debuts
2010 French television series endings